Phags-pa is a Unicode block containing characters from the 'Phags-pa script promulgated as a national script by Kublai Khan, the founder of the Yuan dynasty. It was used primarily in writing Mongolian and Chinese, although it was intended for the use of all written languages of the Mongol Empire.

Block

The block has six variation sequences defined for standardized variants.  They use  (VS01):

Note that four vowel letters have positional variants:

History
The following Unicode-related documents record the purpose and process of defining specific characters in the Phags-pa block:

References 

Unicode blocks